Brian E. Rumpf (born May 11, 1964) is an American Republican politician, who has represented the 9th Legislative District in the New Jersey General Assembly since taking office on June 23, 2003. He has been the Minority Policy Co-Chair in the General Assembly since 2014.

Early life 
He was born in Somerville, New Jersey on May 11, 1964, and graduated from St. Joseph High School. Rumpf received a B.A. in Politics from The Catholic University of America in 1986 and was awarded a Juris Doctor degree from the Washington and Lee University School of Law in 1989. Rumpf served on the Little Egg Harbor Township Committee from 1997 to 2005, serving as its Mayor from 2000 - 2003. He serves as a member of the Little Egg Harbor Township Planning Board.

New Jersey Assembly 
Rumpf was selected by a special Republican convention in June 2003 to fill a vacancy in the Assembly created upon the resignation of Assemblyman Jeffrey Moran to accept appointment as Ocean County Surrogate.

Committees 
Committee assignments for the current session are:
Budget
Health

District 9 
Each of the 40 districts in the New Jersey Legislature has one representative in the New Jersey Senate and two members in the New Jersey General Assembly.Each of the 40 districts in the New Jersey Legislature has one representative in the New Jersey Senate and two members in the New Jersey General Assembly. Representatives from the 9th District for the 2022—2023 Legislative Session are:
Senator Christopher J. Connors
Assemblywoman DiAnne Gove
Assemblyman Brian E. Rumpf

Personal life 
He currently resides in Little Egg Harbor Township where he and his wife Debra are partners at the law firm Rumpf, Rumpf and Reid. They have two children.

He also works full-time for the Ocean County Health Department as director of personnel and program development, a $139,000 position supplementing his $49,000 salary as Assemblyman. It is unclear how much additional income Rumpf earns from his law firm.

Electoral history

Assembly

References

External links
Official 9th Legislative District website
Assemblyman Rumpf's legislative web page, New Jersey Legislature
New Jersey Legislature financial disclosure forms - 2012 2011 2010 2009 2008 2007 2006 2005 2004
New Jersey Voter Information Website for 2003
Little Egg Harbor Township - bio of Brian Rumpf
Assembly Member Brian E. Rumpf, Project Vote Smart
Little Egg Harbor School District - interview with Brian Rumpf

1964 births
Living people
Republican Party members of the New Jersey General Assembly
Mayors of places in New Jersey
New Jersey city council members
People from Little Egg Harbor Township, New Jersey
Politicians from Ocean County, New Jersey
Politicians from Somerville, New Jersey
St. Joseph Academy (New Jersey) alumni
Catholic University of America alumni
Washington and Lee University School of Law alumni
21st-century American politicians